Böyükdüz (also, Böyük Düz and Bëyuk-Dyuz) is a village and municipality in the Kangarli District of Nakhchivan, Azerbaijan.  It has a population of 1,435.

References 

Populated places in Kangarli District